The University of Béjaïa or University Abderrahmane Mira of Béjaïa is a university in Béjaïa, Algeria. It is named after Abderrahmane Mira.

Set up in 1983, it became a university in 1998.

References

External links
 University of Béjaïa 

Bejaia
Buildings and structures in Béjaïa Province
Kabylie
Educational institutions established in 1983
1983 establishments in Algeria